The Diaoyutai State Guesthouse (DSG) is a diplomatic complex in Haidian District, Beijing, China, where the Chinese state leadership offers receptions to visiting foreign dignitaries. It includes a number of villas and gardens. The hotel complex is mentioned as one of the Ten Great Buildings, a list of landmarks constructed in 1959 for the 10th anniversary of the People's Republic of China.

The guesthouse is located in Beijing's Haidian District, to the west of Sanlihe Road and to the east of Yuyuantan Park. It is where Chinese president and Communist Party general secretary Xi Jinping offered tea to visiting British Prime Minister Theresa May in 2018.

The guesthouse is used to house visiting foreign dignitaries and provincial government officials. During the Mao era, Kang Sheng, Mao's primary hit-man against his opponents, used the complex as his base to organize a team of ideologues to campaign against Soviet revisionism. In the times of widespread poverty, the people here were served with very good food. Others who used to work here with Kang Sheng include Wu Lengxi, Wang Li, Yao Qin and Fan Ruoyu. During the Cultural Revolution, it was used as the office of the Central Cultural Revolution Group, and the residence of Chinese Communist Party chairman Mao Zedong, Jiang Qing (Madame Mao), Chen Boda and Kang Sheng. Since then, the guesthouse has also been open to paying customers. North Korean leader Kim Jong-un stayed at the Guesthouse's No. 18 villa during his 2018 trip to China.

The name "Diaoyutai" means "angling platform", and is so named because the site was formerly a favorite fishing spot of Emperor Zhangzong of Jin, and is not related to the Diaoyutai Islands.

See also

 List of hotels in Beijing
 Jingxi Hotel
 Paekhwawon State Guest House
 Grand Hotel (Taipei)

External links
 The Diaoyutai State Guesthouse (official website)

References

Hotels in Beijing
Buildings and structures in Haidian District
State guesthouses
Cultural Revolution